The Cyclopes are a group of one-eyed giants in Greek mythology.

Cyclopes may also refer to:

 The genus Cyclopes, containing the species silky anteater.

See also
 Cyclops (disambiguation)